Operation Harpoon or Battle of Pantelleria (Italian:  [Battle of mid-June]) was one of two simultaneous Allied convoys sent to supply Malta in the Axis-dominated central Mediterranean Sea in mid-June 1942, during the Second World War. Operation Vigorous was a west-bound convoy from Alexandria and Operation Harpoon was an east-bound convoy operation from Gibraltar. Two of the six ships in the Harpoon convoy completed the journey, at the cost of several Allied warships. The Vigorous convoy was driven back by the Italian fleet after being badly damaged by Axis aircraft.

News of the two operations had been unwittingly revealed to the Axis by the US Military Attaché in Egypt, Colonel Bonner Fellers, who had been submitting detailed military reports on British activities to Washington. The American code was later revealed by Ultra intercepts to have been broken by Italian military intelligence.

Background

Malta

Siege, 1942

In 1942, Axis bombing of Malta smashed the docks, ships, aircraft and airfields by the end of April 1942. Axis bombing was switched to targets preliminary to invasion: camps, barracks, warehouses and road junctions. After 18 April, German bombing suddenly stopped and Italian bombers took over, regularly bombing with small formations of aircraft. During the month, Axis aircraft flew more than  against  the Royal Air Force (RAF) all but  which were fighter sorties. The bombing demolished or damaged   were killed and  wounded. Good shelters existed but some of the casualties were caused by delayed-action bombs.

As Malta was running short of supplies, Convoy MW10 sailed from Alexandria on 21 March. The convoy was the subject of a half-hearted attack by the Italian Fleet; the Italians intercepted the convoy and inflicted much damage on several escorts in the Second Battle of Sirte but the weaker British force fended off the Italian squadron. The attack on the convoy meant that the convoy reached Malta in the morning and not at night as expected, leaving the merchant ships exposed to Axis air attack. In the following 48 hours, all the merchant ships were sunk off Malta or destroyed inside the port; barely  of supplies were unloaded.

Three destroyers, three submarines, three minesweepers, five tugs, a water carrier and a floating crane were sunk in port and more ships damaged. The island continued to function as a staging post but the Axis bombing campaign neutralised Malta as an offensive base. Two boats of the 10th Submarine Flotilla had been sunk, two were damaged in harbour and on 26 April the flotilla was ordered out because of mining by small fast craft, which were undetectable by radar and inaudible during the bombing; the surviving minesweepers were too reduced in numbers to clear the approaches. Three reconnaissance aircraft remained and only  sorties were flown, with eleven more by Fleet Air Arm (FAA) aircraft during the month. By the start of June, only two Fairey Albacores and two Fairey Swordfish were left.

Offensive operations

From December 1941,  bombing neutralised Malta, decrypts of Italian  cipher messages showed more sailings and fewer losses and on 23 February 1942, an Italian convoy, led by the battleship Duilio, reached Tripoli. By the end of February,  had crossed without escort and a blackout caused by a change to the  machine, in early March, made little difference to the British for lack of means. After the British broke back into   supply journeys had been made by May, only nine being spotted by air reconnaissance. On 14 April, five Malta aircraft were shot down and the submarine  was lost.

The Axis was able to reinforce North Africa sufficient for General Erwin Rommel to try to attack before the British. In late April, the British Chiefs of Staff ruled that there would be no convoy to Malta in May, because the Italian fleet could be expected to sail and convoy would need battleship and aircraft carrier cover, which was not available. An operation to fly Spitfires to Malta succeeded and anti-aircraft ammunition was to be supplied by fast minelayer, with which Malta must hold on until mid-June, when the situation in the Western Desert should have been clarified. If Martuba or Benghazi in Cyrenaica had been captured by the Eighth Army, a westbound convoy from Alexandria might survive without cover from battleships and aircraft carriers. It would also be known if  aircraft had been diverted to the Russian Front and if the crisis in the Indian Ocean had abated, sufficient for ships to escort a fast convoy from Alexandria.

Unternehmen Herkules

Gleanings from prisoners of war and diplomatic sources led to a certain apprehension about the meaning of troop movements in southern Italy. The absence of evidence from signals intelligence and air reconnaissance led to a conclusion that an invasion was not imminent but the need to protect the source of information meant that this was not disclosed by the British. That preparations were being made were revealed on 7 February through the decryption of  Enigma messages but by 23 March the invasion scare had died down and more bombing was expected. By 31 March the progress of the Axis bombing campaign led to a prediction that the attempt would be made in April but this was soon discounted.

On 26 April, Enigma revealed that  II was being withdrawn. By 2 May, a  bomber group and a fighter group had been withdrawn with more to follow, which explained the lull. Hitler and Mussolini agreed to  pursuing the British into Egypt for the rest of June and into July, which meant cancelling Hercules.

Western Desert Campaign

After the success of Operation Crusader (18 November – 30 December 1941), the Eighth Army advanced  westwards to El Agheila in Libya, capturing airfields and landing grounds to provide air cover for Malta convoys. The British misjudged the speed of Axis reinforcement and expected to attack well before the Axis but  forestalled the Eighth Army by beginning an offensive on 21 January 1942. By 6 February, the British had been defeated, forced to retreat east of the Jebel Akhdar back to the Gazala line just west of Tobruk, where  had begun its retirement seven weeks earlier. At the Battle of Gazala (26 May – 21 June),  attacked first again but appeared close to defeat until 11 June. The Allied Operation Julius began on the same day as the  broke out and by 14 June, forced the British to retreat towards Tobruk. The Axis forces pursued the British into Egypt and the Desert Air Force lost the Libyan landing grounds from which to cover Malta convoys.

Prelude

Operation Julius

Two weeks before the convoys, the carrier  began operations to deliver  to Malta, which increased the number to  fighters. Air operations for the two convoys began on 24 May, when Vickers Wellington bombers of 104 Squadron from Malta began bombing airfields and ports in Sicily and southern Italy. On 11 June, the Wellingtons were withdrawn to accommodate six Wellington torpedo bombers of 38 Squadron, Bristol Beaufort torpedo-bombers of 217 Squadron and Martin Baltimore reconnaissance aircraft of 69 Squadron. Aircraft from Gibraltar, Malta and Egypt also began reconnaissance flights on 11 June, searching for the Italian fleet.

Short-range fighters based in Palestine, Egypt, Cyrenaica and Malta were to provide air cover and as the convoy moved out of range, protection would be taken over by Curtiss Kittyhawks of 250 Squadron equipped with long-range fuel tanks, Bristol Beaufighters from 252 Squadron and 272 Squadron and Beaufighter night fighters from 227 Squadron. Air cover from Cyrenaica could not overlap with coverage from Malta leaving a gap but Wellingtons of 205 Group and the light bombers of the Desert Air Force would attack Axis airfields in North Africa. 201 (General Reconnaissance) Group would provide reconnaissance and anti-submarine sorties and a small sabotage party was to land on Crete and attack Axis aircraft on the ground.

Operation Vigorous

Vigorous was planned as a joint Royal Navy–RAF operation, to be conducted from the headquarters of 201 (General Reconnaissance) Group by Admiral Henry Harwood and Air Marshal Arthur Tedder, with Rear Admiral Philip Vian in command of the convoy and escorts (Force A). If a larger Italian force attacked, Vian was to protect the convoy with smoke and the escorts were to repulse the attackers with torpedoes and try to inflict early casualties against two of the Italian ships using gunfire. Force A comprised four Dido-class 5.25-inch light cruisers and a C-class anti-aircraft cruiser, three 6-inch Town class cruisers and  four corvettes, two minesweepers, four Motor Torpedo Boats (MTB) and two rescue ships. The former battleship  was pressed into service to masquerade as a contemporary battleship. Two submarine flotillas were to send nine boats to screen the convoy and to patrol areas that the Italian fleet was likely to be found.

Convoy

12 June

Convoy MW4 left Gibraltar on 12 June 1942, with six merchantmen (the British Troilus, Burdwan and Orari, the Dutch Tanimbar, the American Chant and the tanker Kentucky) carrying  of cargo and oil. The Harpoon convoy was escorted by Force X, the anti-aircraft cruiser , nine destroyers, the fast minelayer  and smaller ships. Eagle carried  16 Sea Hurricanes of 801 Naval Air Squadron (801 NAS) and 813 NAS and four Fairey Fulmars of 807 NAS. Argus had two more Fulmars of 807 NAS and 18 Swordfish of 824 NAS.

14 June
Two British fighters managed to shoot it down before it could send a sighting report. Escapade fired on a submarine but it turned out to be Westcott returning from refuelling. The  was in the vicinity and at  fired two torpedoes at Eagle, which logged an underwater explosion at  The crew of Giada heard three explosions and claimed a hit. The first air attacks were made by Italian Savoia-Marchetti SM.79 torpedo bombers, which sank Tanimbar, south of Sardinia. Liverpool was damaged and towed back to Gibraltar by Antelope, under air attack (arriving on 17 June). Later on 14 June, the covering force returned to Gibraltar, short of the Strait of Sicily. The fast minelayer Welshman was detached and travelled to Malta alone, delivered ammunition, then sailed back next day to rejoin the convoy escorts.

15 June

At dawn on 15 June, near Pantelleria, the lightly defended convoy was subjected to a coordinated attack by Axis aircraft and the Italian 7th Cruiser Division ( [Vice-Admiral] Alberto da Zara),  and the destroyers Ascari, Alfredo Oriani, Lanzerotto Malocello, Premuda and Ugolino Vivaldi. The cruiser Cairo also received two rounds from Italian gunfire. Italian reports claimed that the destroyers Vivaldi and Malocello closed to within  of the merchantmen and hit one of the freighters at about  Vivaldi was eventually hit by a shot from the British destroyers and caught fire but was taken in tow and saved by Malocello and Premuda.

The  tanker Kentucky, Chant and the freighter Burdwan, already disabled by air attack, were abandoned by their escorts, which had been trying to scuttle Kentucky and Burdwan with gunfire and depth charges, when the Italian cruisers returned shortly before noon. Burdwan and Kentucky, already on fire, were sunk by gunfire from Raimondo Montecuccoli, Eugenio di Savoia and the destroyers Ascari and Oriani; Kentucky was also struck by a torpedo from Oriani. Ascari finished off Burdwan, which by then was an abandoned hulk, with two torpedoes. Chant had already been sunk by bombing and the Italian squadron found her smouldering wreck site. While scaring off the small escorting vessels of the crippled ships and according to post-battle reports from both sides, Raimondo Montecuccoli hit the minesweeper  at "approx. 26,000 yards". Fires broke out on Hebe, which received extensive splinter damage. Electrical cables to sweep magnetic and acoustic mines, low power wires, steering gear, echo sounding gear and voice pipes were broken, the Kelvin sounding machine, the commanding officer's cabin were damaged and a whaler was rendered unseaworthy.

Partridge was recovered and taking the disabled Bedouin in tow when the Italian cruisers with two destroyers reappeared; the tow was cast off, leaving Bedouin adrift. At  Partridge managed to withdraw and run for Gibraltar but Bedouin had already been hit during the battle by at least twelve  shells plus several near misses and had taken on a severe list. Bedouin was eventually sunk by an aerial torpedo from a SM.79 bomber that Bedouin shot down as it sank. Twenty-eight of the Bedouin crew were killed and more than 200 were rescued and taken prisoner by the Italians; the majority by the small hospital ship Meta. The Italian squadron was attacked by mistake at 2:20 p.m. by German Ju. 88 bombers, without suffering any damage. The Italian warships witnessed the sinking of at least one of the crippled vessels of the convoy shortly after, just before sailing back to Pantelleria. Later In the evening, the surviving ships ran into a minefield off Malta. The destroyers Badsworth and Matchless and the freighter Orari struck mines and were damaged; the Polish destroyer  sank after midnight. Of the six merchantmen, Orari and Troilus reached Malta, the former having lost some cargo in the mine explosion; Hebe also struck a mine and suffered further damage, requiring a month in dry dock.

Aftermath

Analysis

Captain Hardy reported,

In 1960, Ian Playfair, the British official historian, wrote that the relationship of the "battle for supplies" with the land war reached a climax in the second half of 1942. Far from the Eighth Army capturing airfields to the west in the Cyrenaican bulge, the army had been defeated at Gazala while Operation Julius was on and lost the landing grounds to the east. The disaster at Gazala had led to the military forces on Malta trying to save Egypt rather than vice versa. Vigorous had been a "disappointing operation" and turned back because the British and US air attacks on the Italian battle fleet had failed to inflict the damage hoped for. Force A could not hope to prevail in a surface action, a view echoed by Greene and Massignani in 2003. The two ships of Operation Harpoon that reached Malta delivered  of supplies which, with a decent harvest, might keep the population of Malta fed until September but the loss of the tanker Kentucky and the consumption of aviation fuel at Malta, led to fighters being given priority over the offensive force. Transit flights through Malta, except for Beauforts, were suspended; only close-range air attacks on easy targets were to be permitted and more fuel for the fighters was to be carried to Malta by submarine.

In 1962, the British naval official historian, Stephen Roskill, called the Axis success undeniable. Malta had not been supplied and the British had lost a cruiser, three destroyers and two merchantmen against the sinking of Trento and minor damage to Littorio. No attempt was made to run another convoy from Alexandria until the Eighth Army had conquered Libya. Roskill wrote that with hindsight, the course of events on land made naval operations in the central Mediterranean inherently dangerous. During the operation, the withdrawal of the Eighth Army forfeited one of the airfields being used for air cover. With Axis aircraft based along the length of the route to Malta, air power decided the course of events, although the diversion of Axis bombers against the convoys had been of some benefit to the British as they conducted the "scuttle" to El Alamein. In 1941,  ships sailing for Malta had arrived but in the first seven months of 1942, of  ten were sunk, ten turned back damaged, three were sunk on arrival and seven delivered their supplies.

In their 1998 publication, Greene and Massignani wrote

In 2001, Giorgio Giorgerini wrote that the Battle of Pantelleria was not a strategic success because two merchantmen reached Malta but was a satisfying tactical success; one of the few instances in which Italian warships fought aggressively enough against their opponents, even though somewhat exaggerated beyond its merits in later writing. In 2007, Malcolm Llewellyn-Jones, editor of the Royal Navy staff history, wrote that FAA fighters shot down  aircraft and ships' gunners destroyed another sixteen, for a total of  aircraft.

In 2003, Richard Woodman wrote that on 16 June, Harwood reported that,

In a later report, Harwood blamed the RAF for not providing enough aircraft capable of defeating the Italian battle fleet. The only success of Julius was the arrival of the two ships from Harpoon.

Casualties
The British suffered casualties of twenty-eight men killed on HMS Bedouin, fifteen on HMS Liverpool, thirteen on ORP Kujawiak, nine on HMS Badsworth, two on HMS Cairo, one on HMS Partridge, three on the auxiliary minesweeper Justified, twenty-three on Tanimbar, four on Chant, three on Burdwan. The ten most injured survivors of Bedouin were picked up by a CANT Z.506  (Heron) seaplane after a  aircraft had spotted them and dropped a flare.

Orders of battle 
 Key: † sunk, # damaged, ## badly damaged.

Allies
 United Kingdom
 Poland
 Convoy WS-19z (GM4 from Gibraltar) All data cited to O'Hara (2013) unless specified.
 Transports: Burdwan†, Chant†, Orari ##, Tanimbar†, Troilus
 Tanker: Kentucky†
 Force W, covering force Vice-Admiral  Alban Curteis (All data cited to O'Hara (2013) unless specified.)
 Battleship: 
 Aircraft carriers:  (16 Sea Hurricanes and 4 Fulmars),  (2 Fulmars and 18 Swordfish)
 Light cruisers:  (flag),  ##, 
 Force X, convoy escort Captain Cecil Hardy (All data cited to O'Hara (2013) unless specified.)
 Light cruiser (AA)  # (flag)
 11th Destroyer flotilla: †,  ##,  #
 12th Destroyer flotilla: ,  ##, †
 Minesweepers:  ##, 
 Minesweeping motor launches: ML-121, 134, 135, 168, 459, 462 (All data cited to O'Hara (2013) unless specified.)
 Minelayer (special service) 
 Force Y, replenishment force (All data cited to O'Hara (2013) unless specified.)
 Fleet tanker: 
 Corvettes: HMS Coltsfoot, Geranium

Regia Marina

 7th Cruiser Division (Ammiraglio di Divisione [Rear-Admiral] Alberto da Zara) All data from Greene and Massignani (2002) and O'Hara (2013) unless specified.
 Light cruiser  (flag)
 Light cruiser 
 10th Destroyer Squadron
 Ascari
 Alfredo Oriani
 Premuda
 14th Destroyer Squadron
 Ugolino Vivaldi ##
 Lanzerotto Malocello

Gallery

See also 
 Battle of the Mediterranean
 Bonner Fellers
 Malta Convoys
 Operation Pedestal
 Operation Vigorous
 Operation White

References

Bibliography

Further reading
  
 
 
 
   Semi-official history

External links 
 Operation Harpoon
 Order of battle
 Italian Cruiser Montecuccoli
 Battaglia di Mezzo Giugno – Plancia di Commando

1942 in Malta
Aerial operations and battles of World War II involving the United Kingdom
Conflicts in 1942
Italian naval victories in the battle of the Mediterranean
June 1942 events
Malta Convoys
Naval aviation operations and battles
Naval battles of World War II involving Italy
Naval battles and operations of World War II involving the United Kingdom